Leandro Nicolás Bolmaro (born 11 September 2000) is an Argentine-Italian professional basketball player for Lenovo Tenerife of the Liga ACB. He also represents the senior Argentina national team.

Early years and youth career
Bolmaro began playing the sport of basketball in his home country of Argentina. He started playing with the youth teams of a local sports club named Almafuerte from Las Varillas town in Córdoba. On 13 April 2018, he played for the World Team at the Nike Hoop Summit in Portland, Oregon.

Professional career

Estudiantes de Bahía Blanca (2017–2018)
Bolmaro began his pro career on 16 July 2017, when he was 16 years old, after he signed with Estudiantes de Bahía Blanca of the Liga Nacional de Básquet, the top basketball league in Argentina. In 23 games played during the 2017–18 season, Bolmaro averaged 2.0 points, 0.7 rebounds, 0.5 assists, and 0.4 steals, in 7.2 minutes per game. He shot 37.3% overall from the field, 53.6% on 2-point field goals, 17.4% on 3-point field goals, and 75.0% on free throws.

Barcelona (2018–2021)
For the 2018–19 LEB Oro season, Bolmaro moved to the Spanish club FC Barcelona. He averaged 10.4 points, 3.1 rebounds, 2.7 assists, and 1.2 steals per game for the club reserve team while playing in the LEB Oro, Spain's second-tier level league. With the reserve team, he played in a total of 33 games and averaged 24.1 minutes per game of playing time. He shot 39.6% overall from the field, 45.5% on 2-point field goals, 30.8% on 3-point field goals, and 65.2% on free throws.

In 2019–20 FC Barcelona Bàsquet season, he split playing time between Barcelona's reserve team and senior team, which competed in the Liga ACB, the highest level Spanish league, and the EuroLeague. During the 2019–20 Spanish 3rd Division season, while playing with Barcelona's reserve B team, he averaged 14.9 points, 2.7 rebounds, 3.6 assists, and 1.8 steals, in 26.3 minutes per game, in 9 games played in the Spanish 3rd Division. On 13 August 2020, Bolmaro signed a contract extension with Barcelona through 2023. After getting selected in the NBA draft, Bolmaro opted to stay with FC Barcelona.

In September 2021, Bolmaro paid his buyout clause in order to leave Barcelona and subsequently be able to sign a 4-year rookie-scale contract with the Minnesota Timberwolves.

Minnesota Timberwolves (2021–2022)
In the 2020 NBA draft, Bolmaro was selected by the New York Knicks with the 23rd overall selection, but his draft rights were traded to the Minnesota Timberwolves in a three-team trade.
On 18 September 2021, Bolmaro signed a 4-year, $11.8M rookie contract with the Timberwolves. Bolmaro made his NBA debut on 20 October 2021 in the Timberwolves 124-106 win against the Houston Rockets. He hadn’t seen many minutes before 27 November 2021, in which he played a career-high 17 minutes against the Philadelphia 76ers.

Utah Jazz (2022–2023) 
On 6 July 2022, Bolmaro was traded along with Malik Beasley, Jarred Vanderbilt, Patrick Beverley, the draft rights to Walker Kessler, four future first-round picks, and a pick swap to the Utah Jazz in exchange for Rudy Gobert. On 16 February 2023, Bolmaro reached a contract buyout agreement with the Jazz, and he was subsequently waived.

Lenovo Tenerife (2023–present) 
On 2 March 2023, Bolmaro signed with Lenovo Tenerife of the Liga ACB.

National team career

Junior national team
In 2017, Bolmaro won a silver medal with Argentina's Under-17 national team at the FIBA South America Under-17 Championship in Lima, Peru. He averaged a team-high 13.8 points per game. Bolmaro also represented the Argentine Under-19 national team at the 2019 FIBA Under-19 World Cup in Heraklion, Greece, where his team finished in 11th place. He left the tournament's opening game early with a minor strain. During the tournament, he was Argentina's leading scorer, with an average of 10.8 points per game.

Senior national team
On 29 July 2021, Bolmaro scored 2 points in a loss to the Spain men's national basketball team at the 2020 Summer Olympics in Tokyo, Japan.

In 2022, Bolmaro won the gold medal with the senior team in the 2022 FIBA AmeriCup held in Recife, Brazil. He was one of Argentina´s shooting guards in the tournament.

Career statistics

NBA

|-
| style="text-align:left;"| 
| style="text-align:left;"| Minnesota
| 35 || 2 || 6.9 || .315 || .278 || .846 || 1.2 || .6 || .2 || .0 || 1.4
|-
| style="text-align:left;"| 
| style="text-align:left;"| Utah
| 14 || 0 || 4.9 || .150 || .000 ||  || .5 || .5 || .2 || .1 || .4
|- class="sortbottom"
| style="text-align:center;" colspan="2"| Career
| 49 || 2 || 6.3 || .270 || .227 || .846 || 1.0 || .6 || .2 || .0 || 1.1

EuroLeague

|-
| style="text-align:left;"| 2019–20
| rowspan=2 style="text-align:left;"| Barcelona
| 6 || 1 || 9.2 || .286 || .000 || 1.000 || .8 || 2.3 || 1.0 || .3 || 1.8 || 1.0
|-
| style="text-align:left;"| 2020–21
| 30 || 0 || 9.8 || .420 || .381 || .786 || 1.1 || 1.3 || .3 || .1 || 2.9 || 2.6
|- class="sortbottom"
| colspan=2 style="text-align:center;"| Career
| 36 || 1 || 9.7 || .391 || .308 || .806 || 1.1 || 1.5 || .4 || .1 || 2.8 || 2.4

References

External links

 
 FIBA Profile
 Euroleague.net Profile
 Liga ACB Profile 
 Spanish 2nd Division / 3rd Division Profile 

2000 births
Living people
Argentine expatriate basketball people in Spain
Argentine expatriate basketball people in the United States
Argentine men's basketball players
Argentine people of Italian descent
Basketball players at the 2020 Summer Olympics
Estudiantes de Bahía Blanca basketball players
FC Barcelona Bàsquet players
FC Barcelona Bàsquet B players
Iowa Wolves players
Italian expatriate basketball people in Spain
Italian men's basketball players
Liga ACB players
Minnesota Timberwolves players
National Basketball Association players from Argentina
New York Knicks draft picks
Olympic basketball players of Argentina
People from Córdoba Province, Argentina
Salt Lake City Stars players
Shooting guards
Small forwards
Sportspeople from Córdoba, Argentina
Utah Jazz players